The 2008 United States Senate election in Michigan was held on November 4, 2008 Incumbent Democratic U.S. Senator Carl Levin won reelection to a sixth and final term.

General election

Candidates 
 Scott Boman (Libertarian)
 Doug Dern (Natural Law)
 Carl Levin, incumbent U.S. Senator (Democratic)
 Jack Hoogendyk, State Representative from Kalamazoo (Republican)
 Harley Mikkelson (Green)
 Michael Nikitin (U.S. Taxpayers)

Campaign
Levin's 2002 opponent Andrew Raczkowski considered running again, but military commitments forced him to drop out. State representative Jack Hoogendyk declared his candidacy to challenge Levin. Troy engineer Bart Baron was also running.
Baron apparently failed to qualify for the August 5, 2008 party primary ballot in the Michigan Secretary of State's office. So only Hoogendyk was listed on the Republican side in the Michigan primary election. Levin was unopposed on the Democratic side. The filing deadline for candidates to run was May 13.

Minor party candidates who ran included Harley Mikkelson of the Green Party, Scotty Boman of the Libertarian Party, Michael Nikitin of the U.S. Taxpayers Party and Doug Dern of the Natural Law Party. Levin, who maintained a huge fundraising advantage over his opponents, easily won re-election.

Predictions

Polling

Debates 
On October 19 WGVU Public television hosted a Senatorial debate to which only Democratic Senator Carl Levin and Republican State Representative Jack Hoogendyk were invited.  They debated topics such as the economy, immigration, and foreign policy.

Levin blamed job loss in Michigan on President Bush, while Hoogendyk blamed Levin.  Levin supported a Federal bailout of the auto industry, while Hoogendyk opposed the idea.

The event, which was moderated by WZZM TV 13's News anchor Peter Ross, was met with protest by supporters of excluded candidates.  One of the protesters was Libertarian candidate Scotty Boman, who asserted that he met the stations qualifications.  WGVU required the candidates to show at least 5% support in a statewide scientific poll, but Boman said no statewide poll had been done that included him.
An exclusive WXYZ poll included all of the candidates, but only contacted respondents in the 7th and 9th Congressional district.  Boman also claimed that public broadcasters should have invited the other candidates since it is supported with tax dollars.

Senator Carl Levin and State Representative Jack Hoogendyk met again, the following day (October 20),  for a forum hosted by the Detroit Economic Club.

Results
Levin was declared the winner right when the polls closed in Michigan. Levin won all but six of Michigan's 83 counties. Levin unsurprisingly won major metropolitan areas, such as Wayne County home of Detroit or Ingham County home of Lansing. He also became the first Democratic Senator since Donald Riegle in 1982 to carry Kent County home of Grand Rapids. When combining the suburban and rural counties, it was too much for Hoogendyk to overcome. Levin’s 3,038,386 votes is the most received by any political candidate in the state’s history.

See also 
 2008 United States Senate elections

References

External links 
 Elections from the Michigan Secretary of State
 U.S. Congress candidates for Michigan at Project Vote Smart
 Michigan, U.S. Senate from CQ Politics
 Michigan U.S. Senate from OurCampaigns.com
 Michigan U.S. Senate race from 2008 Race Tracker
 Campaign contributions from OpenSecrets
 Hoogendyk (R) vs Levin (D-i) graph of multiple polls from Pollster.com
 Official campaign websites (Archived)
 Carl Levin
 Jack Hoogendyk
 Harley Mikkelson

2008
Michigan
United States Senate